Blinded by the Light: The Very Best of Manfred Mann's Earth Band is the fourth compilation album by British rock band Manfred Mann's Earth Band, released in 1992.

Track listing

Personnel 
 Manfred Mann – keyboards, backing vocals
 Colin Pattenden – bass
 Dave Flett – lead guitar
 Chris Hamlet Thompson – lead vocals, rhythm guitar
 Chris Slade – drums, backing vocals, percussion
 Mick Rogers – guitars, vocals

Charts

References

External links
Blinded By The Light: The Very Best Of Manfred Mann's Earth Band (List Of Releases), Discogs.com
Blinded By The Light: The Very Best Of Manfred Mann's Earth Band, Allmusic.com

Manfred Mann's Earth Band albums
Arcade Records compilation albums
1992 greatest hits albums
Compilation albums by British artists